Marvin Kren (born 1980) is an Austrian director. He is best known for his work in the horror film genre.

Filmography

References

External links

1980 births
Living people
Austrian film directors
Horror film directors
Austrian television directors
Film people from Vienna